The 2008 Canoe Sprint European Championships were held in Milan, Italy.

Medal overview

Men

Women

Medal table

References

External links
 European Canoe Association

2008
2008 in Italian sport
Sprint European Championships
Canoeing and kayaking competitions in Italy
Sports competitions in Milan